George Francis Willis (1880, Waynesville, North Carolina - July 20, 1932) was an American millionaire who made his fortunes with patent medicines.

Biography
Willis attended Bingham Military School in Asheville, North Carolina, and later moved to Knoxville, Tennessee where he became involved with a patent medicine firm. Willis began to sell and promote the medicines. In 1913 he founded International Proprietaries, Inc., and made a fortune selling a tonic called  Tanlac. Although chemists at the time branded it quackery, as it was simply fortified wine with herbs and a laxative, the tonic sold very well nevertheless. Willis sold his firm in 1922 but then made another fortune with Zonite, an antiseptic preparation based on Dakin's solution, widely used in World War I.

In 1922, as head of its finance committee, Willis led a $2 million fundraising drive for Georgia Tech.

Willis was also active in real estate development in the Atlanta area. Willis commissioned the 1917 Druid Apartments at the corner of Ponce de Leon Avenue and Highland Avenue in Atlanta's Poncey-Highland neighborhood, now the site of the Briarcliff Plaza, Atlanta's first shopping center.

In 1924, he purchased the town of Ingleside, Georgia, just east of Decatur and there built the new planned community of Avondale Estates, Georgia. The distinctive Tudor Revival architecture of the town was inspired by a recent trip that he and his wife had taken to Stratford-upon-Avon, England. Willis sought input from internationally known city planners; Avondale Estates was the first documented planned city in the Southeastern United States.

In 1928 Willis introduced a new medicine, Sargon, and became president of the Stone Mountain Confederate Monumental Association.

References

External links
"Sargon", Ray City (Georgia) history blog

American health care businesspeople
American real estate businesspeople
Patent medicine businesspeople
People from Waynesville, North Carolina
People from Asheville, North Carolina
People from Knoxville, Tennessee
People from Avondale Estates, Georgia
1880 births
1932 deaths